Huntik: Secrets & Seekers is an Italian animated television series created by Iginio Straffi, the creator of Winx Club. It was produced by Rainbow, a studio co-owned by Straffi and Viacom at the time of the show's conclusion. The series is about four adventurers who are part of a group called the Huntik Foundation. The Huntik team is led by their top operative Dante Vale. Every episode takes place in a different historical city and features magical elements inspired by European mythology. The characters are designed in a style that combines Japanese anime with Western animation.

Iginio Straffi conceived Huntik in 2006. Its visual elements, artwork, and music were produced entirely in Italy, while animation and some scriptwriting were done abroad. The first season premiered on Rai Due in Italy on 12 January 2009, and it set a record number of viewers when it was rerun on Rai Gulp. Production on a second season began shortly after the premiere of the first.

In Italy, the second season debuted in 2011. Also in 2011, Viacom gained 30% ownership of the Rainbow studio, and Huntiks second season premiered on Viacom's Nickelodeon networks internationally. In the United States, season two premiered on Nicktoons on April 21, 2013.

Series overview 

The series follows Lok Lambert as he uncovers the secret legacy of his missing father. His father, Eathon, was a member of the Huntik Foundation and a part of a secret world of magic users known as Seekers and creatures known as Titans. On his mission to uncover what happened to his father, Lok is joined by Dante Vale, Sophie Casterwill, Zhalia Moon, and a talking Titan called Cherit.

Season one focuses on the fight against the evil Organization, led by a powerful Seeker known as the Professor. Along the way, the team discovers the Amulet of Will and the powerful Legendary Titans. Though the Professor eventually acquires the three Legendary Titans of Mind, Body, and Spirit in a bid for immortality, he is defeated by the Huntik team.

In season two, an ancient and evil group known as the Blood Spiral reveals itself and seeks to summon evil and destructive beings known as the Nullifiers. This will have ramifications for everyone, with the Blood Spirals being linked to the destruction of Sophie's remaining family, the descendants of the powerful Lord Casterwill. A new hero, Den Fears, joins the Huntik team as Zhalia goes undercover within the Blood Spiral. A new set of Legendary Titans are uncovered, but their discovery only heralds the resurrection of the Blood Spiral's founder, the Betrayer.

Cast and characters 
 (Yuri Lowenthal in the first season and Matt Caplan in the second): Lok is the son of the legendary Seeker, Eathon Lambert. Though bored by his textbooks, he is excellent at solving puzzles. Lok grew up knowing nothing about being a Seeker until he discovered his father's Amulet. He aspires to be a top Seeker like his father. During season 1, Lok is a key member of the team that took down the Professor, Simon Judeau. During season 2, Lok becomes the new Champion of Casterwill to fight against the Blood Spiral. As the story progresses, he develops romantic feelings for Sophie. Lok's Titan is Kipperin, a green flying moth. 
 (Marc Thompson): Dante is the Huntik Foundation's top Seeker and led a team consisting of Lok Lambert, Sophie Casterwill, and Zhalia Moon. He uses his abilities as a Seeker, a martial artist, and a detective to lead his team on a mission to find the lost father of Lok Lambert. Dante's Titan is Caliban, a powerful Aztec warrior.
 (Karen Strassman): Zhalia is a tough lone wolf who uses her abilities for espionage and creating illusions. Adopted at a young age by Klaus, a member of the Organization, she struggled between her upbringing in the Organization and her new friends within the Huntik Foundation. During season 2, she infiltrated the Blood Spiral for the Foundation and served as a bodyguard for Harrison Fears. Zhalia's Titan is Gareon, a gecko-like creature who can turn invisible.
 (Rebecca Soler): Sophie is a book-smart girl from the Casterwill family's House of Nobles. Her family was lost due to arson, leaving her to believe herself to be the last of the Casterwill nobility. She was raised by her bodyguard, Santiago, and her tutor/butler, LeBlanche. Due to her training, she is able to sense magical energy and to learn new spells with ease. During season 1, she had a rivalry with Zhalia Moon. During season 2, she takes the position of the head of the Casterwill family. As the story progresses, she develops romantic feelings for Lok. Sophie's Titan is Sabriel, an elegant swordswoman. 
 (Marc Thompson): Cherit is an ancient, bat-like Titan who was once the friend of Lord Casterwill. He is among the only Titans who are able to speak audibly. Through unknown causes, his memory of the past and his Amulet were lost. His adventures with the Huntik Foundation help him to rediscover his past as he assists by powering up allied Titans.
Den Fears (Grant George): Den and his brother, Harrison, grew up as outcast orphans. Much like Lok, Den dislikes having to study from books. Due to having been marked by the Spiral, Den is able to sense when the Spiral is performing great evils.  During season 2, they were approached by the Blood Spiral. Den sees the Spiral as evil and instead joins the Huntik Foundation. He fights against the Blood Spiral in order to save his brother from their evil influence. Den's Titan is Vigilante, a dark cloaked assassin. 
The Professor/Simon Judeau (Mike Pollock): The Professor is a former member of the Huntik Foundation and the founder of the Organization. After a mission with Eathon Lambert, Lok's father, Simon, was cursed and his body mangled. The Professor is the only one who knew what happened to Eathon. Due to his time as a team with Eathon Lambert, the Professor named his dog Eathon after his old friend. During season 1, the Professor was the leader of the Organization.  The Professor was defeated by the Huntik team. The Professor's Titan is Araknos, a spider-like Legendary Titan who can control minds.
Grier (Richard Epcar): Grier is the rightful ruler of Sutos who believes that discipline will lead to peace. In season 1, Grier was part of the Organization in order to bring peace from civil war to the people of Sutos. In season 2, Grier fights side-by-side with Dante against the Blood Spirals and took control of the Organization from Wilder. Grier's Titan is Breaker, a huge four-armed bear.
Rassimov (Maddie Blaustein and Marc Diraison): Rassimov was the leader of the Blood Spiral under the Betrayer. During Season 1, Rassimov infiltrated the Organization and orchestrated the fall of the Professor and planted Demigorgan as a Holotome within the Professor's . During season 2, Rassimov revealed his true allegiance. Rassimov's Titan is Thornment, an Egyptian mummy who uses sharp vines to ensnare her enemies. 
Mr. Wilder (Christopher Kromer): Wilder was the second leader of the Organization. Wilder's Titan is Incubane, a mischievous demon who can fire lasers from his hands.
Kiel (Matt Bernhard): Kiel is a deadly Blood Spiral fanatic and an explosive pyromaniac who figured in Sophie's past. Kiel's Titan is Vulcana, a robed lava woman who controls the element of fire.  
The Betrayer: The Betrayer was one of the original Seekers under Lord Casterwill who betrayed the early Casterwill family in summoning back the Nullifiers to earth. Though defeated by the children of Lord Casterwill, the Betrayer used the power of the Blood Spiral to remain alive. During season 2, he deceived the Huntik team, leading them on false cues to break the seal on the Spiral Mark, restoring him to life and signaling the Nullifiers. Though defeated, the Betrayer's goal of activating the Spiral Mark to signal the Nullifiers was accomplished. The Betrayer's Titan is Demigorgan, the Legendary Titan of Betrayal.

Production 
Iginio Straffi conceived Huntik in 2006 as a spiritual successor to his previous show, Winx Club. Just as the Winx characters were modelled on popular singers, Straffi looked to movie stars when designing the Huntik characters: Johnny Depp served as the basis for Dante Vale, Demi Moore for Zhalia Moon, and Gwyneth Paltrow for Sophie Casterwill. In developing the show, Iginio Straffi wanted to create a "cultured alternative to Japanese manga and American cartoons, giving viewers the opportunity to learn about Italian and European culture." A first season of 26 episodes was announced in October 2006, along with a reported budget of approximately US$8.62 million.

After drawing his initial concept art for Huntik, Straffi "hammered out the kernel of the show" with the help of an international creative team at his animation studio, Rainbow SpA. During these meetings, Sean Molyneaux was tasked with creating the Huntik series bible, a "master document" that covered the show's character descriptions, backstories, and episode synopses. Molyneaux, who was co-writing Winx Club: The Secret of the Lost Kingdom with Iginio Straffi at the time, stated that he "was given a decent amount of freedom to flesh out the details of the plot, the main characters, their story arcs and their pasts, and was responsible for the secondary characters pretty much top to bottom."

The designers of Huntik used e-mail to correspond with each other. All of the design ideas began from the descriptions in either the series bible or an episode script, from which the artists either went "off in their own direction" or wrote to Sean Molyneaux for guidance. When writing new characters in scripts, Molyneaux tried to keep his "descriptions minimalist at first, maybe mentioning a single important fact (a personality trait, or a physical trait in the case of a Titan), hoping that maybe this will inspire the designer." To illustrate the backgrounds of the series, the artists studied photos and visual maps online. After the backgrounds and character animations were put together, art director Simone Borselli reviewed every individual scene three times over (for the first season, there were 11,700 scenes to review). Once the audio effects were added, Borselli repeated the process again, this time reviewing each scene twice.

When drafting the show's action sequences, the Huntik staff avoided violence that could be emulated by viewers. They preferred monster fights over human combat scenes, and instead of punches, the writers called for "spheres of energy" to be shown onscreen. Maurizio De Angelis, the show's story editor, supervised all scripts from Rainbow's studio in Italy. In 2009, he explained that "each screenplay is subject to countless changes, the time ranging from two or three weeks to five or six months." The first season of Huntik involved around three years of writing and revisions, while the second season took almost a year and a half.

Broadcast 
In Italy, Rai Due first broadcast Huntik: Secrets & Seekers on 12 January 2009 at 7:25 a.m. In the United States, the first season premiered on The CW on 3 January 2009, nine days ahead of the Italian debut. Rainbow first released a trailer for the second season in July 2011. In Italy, the new season premiered on Rai Due on 17 September 2011. Rai Gulp replayed the episodes beginning on 22 September.

Following a 2011 purchase in which Viacom gained 30% ownership of Rainbow, Huntik was broadcast on Viacom's Nickelodeon channels worldwide, including Nicktoons in the United States. The second season made its American premiere on Nicktoons, and the full episodes were distributed on Nicktoons' website.

Reception 
In 2009, Will Wade of Common Sense Media wrote that the series "is fun to watch ... if you don't ask too many questions. The action sequences are exciting, the Titans are fearsome, the story is interesting, and the animation is lush and beautiful." Reviewing the show's first DVD release, Mark Beresford of Impulse Gamer positively compared the show's adventure-focused story to the Tintin animations. He commented that the episodes "are pretty addictive and will leave you wanting to get your hands on the rest of the series."

Other media 
A tie-in Huntik trading card game was developed by Upper Deck and released in February 2009, along with starter packs and booster packs. A line of 5 inch action figures has also been released, along with a collection of miniature Titan figures. A Nintendo DS game based on Huntik was announced in mid-2009 for release later that year. The game was ultimately unreleased, but it was planned to feature a 20-hour single-player mission as well as a multiplayer mode. In 2010, an IOS app named "Huntik: Titan Defence" was developed by Celestial Digital Entertainment Ltd. and was released on September 26.

In 2011, two Huntik-themed attractions opened at the MagicLand theme park in Rome. One is a shooting dark ride called "Huntik 5D," which incorporates a CGI-animated Huntik short produced by Rainbow CGI. Each of the ride's guided cars cost 120,000 euros to make. The other is a log flume called "Huntik Spillwater" (later renamed "Yucatan").

References

External links 
Official Huntik: Secrets & Seekers website 

2009 Italian television series debuts
2011 Italian television series endings
2000s Italian television series
2010s Italian television series
Italian children's animated action television series
Italian children's animated adventure television series
Italian children's animated fantasy television series
Anime-influenced Western animated television series
Television shows adapted into comics
Television series created by Iginio Straffi
Television series by Rainbow S.r.l.
Nicktoons (TV network) original programming
Animated television series about monsters
English-language television shows